Jan Schmidt can refer to:

 Jan Schmidt (director)
 Jan Schmidt (footballer)
 Jan Schmidt (badmintonner)
 Jan Schmidt-Garre
 Jan Priiskorn-Schmidt